Umeji is both a unisex Japanese given name and a Japanese surname.

Possible writings
Umeji can be written using different combinations of kanji characters. Here are some examples:

梅二, "plum, two"
梅次, "plum, next"
梅児, "plum, child"
梅治, "plum, to manage/cure"
梅路, "plum, route"
梅爾, "plum, you"

The name can also be written in hiragana うめじ or katakana ウメジ.

Notable people with the given name Umeji
, Japanese actor and voice actor
Umeji Umemoto (楳茂都 梅治, 1927-1968), Japanese female dancer

Notable people with the surname Umejii
Kotaro Umeji, Japanese graphic designer

Japanese-language surnames
Japanese unisex given names